Jack Neil Merritt (October 23, 1930 – January 3, 2018) was a United States Army four-star general who served as U.S. Military Representative, NATO Military Committee (USMILREP) from 1985 to 1987.

Military career
Merritt was born in Lawton, Oklahoma and entered the Army as a private in 1952 at the height of the Korean War and over the next thirty-five years rose to 4-star rank. From battery command in Korea to the 1st Cavalry Division Artillery at Fort Hood, Texas, he commanded at every level in the Field Artillery. His final assignment was as United States Military Representative to the NATO Military Committee from 1985 to 1987.

Merritt was the Honor Graduate of his Officer Candidate School class in 1953. He later earned a Bachelor of General Education degree in military science from the University of Nebraska at Omaha and a Master of Science degree in business administration from George Washington University. Merritt was also top graduate of his Artillery Advance Course, Distinguished Graduate of the Air Command and Staff College and Distinguished Graduate of the Industrial College of the Armed Forces. Moreover, his career touched the entire Army school system. In 1977 he served on the general officer study group that reviewed the West Point honor code and he commanded the Artillery Center and School (1977–80), the Army War College (1980–82) and the Combined Arms Center including the Command and General Staff College (1983).

He also served on the National Security Council staff and had additional assignments on Joint Staff and was the U.S. Military Representative to the NATO Military Committee.

His decorations include the Defense Distinguished Service Medal (one oak leaf cluster), Army Distinguished Service Medal (one oak leaf cluster), Silver Star and Legion of Merit (one oak leaf cluster).

  Defense Distinguished Service Medal
  Army Distinguished Service Medal
  Silver Star
  Legion of Merit
  Distinguished Flying Cross
  Soldier's Medal
  Bronze Star with V Device and two oak leaf clusters
  Air Medal
  Joint Service Commendation Medal
  Army Commendation Ribbon
  Navy and Marine Corps Commendation Medal with V Device

Post military career
After retirement, he served as president of the Association of the United States Army and chairman of the United States Field Artillery Association. He has also served on the board of directors of the Army and Air Force Mutual Aid Association, the Honorary Board of the National World War II Museum, and secretary to the board of directors of the Marshall Legacy Institute.

Personal
Merritt married Rosemary Ralston (December 18, 1928 – February 1, 2019) on October 31, 1953 at Fort Sill, Oklahoma. The couple had three sons, six grandchildren, and, as of 2019, three great-grandchildren.

Merritt died on January 4, 2018, at the age of 87 at his home in Fort Belvoir, Virginia. He was interred at Arlington National Cemetery on May 18, 2018 and his wife was buried beside him on April 17, 2019.

References

External links

1930 births
2018 deaths
People from Lawton, Oklahoma
United States Army personnel of the Korean War
University of Nebraska Omaha alumni
United States Army personnel of the Vietnam War
Recipients of the Air Medal
Recipients of the Soldier's Medal
Recipients of the Distinguished Flying Cross (United States)
Recipients of the Silver Star
George Washington University School of Business alumni
Recipients of the Legion of Merit
United States Army generals
Recipients of the Distinguished Service Medal (US Army)
Commandants of the United States Army Command and General Staff College
Recipients of the Defense Distinguished Service Medal
People from Fort Belvoir, Virginia
Burials at Arlington National Cemetery